Alex Rider (stylized as △LEX RIDER) is a British spy thriller television programme based on the novel series of the same name by Anthony Horowitz. Adapted by Guy Burt, it stars Otto Farrant as the eponymous character, who is recruited by a subdivision of MI6 as a teenage spy to infiltrate places that others are unable to. The series is Amazon's first scripted British Amazon Original series. The show is jointly produced by Eleventh Hour Films and Sony Pictures Television, and is the second screen adaptation of the novels, following the 2006 feature film version of the first novel, Stormbreaker.

The eight-episode first season, based on Point Blanc, premiered on the Amazon Prime Video streaming service in the United Kingdom on 4 June 2020. In November 2020, the series was renewed for a second season, adapting the book Eagle Strike. The second season premiered on 3 December 2021 on IMDb TV, and a third season is in production. The series has received positive reviews, with praise to the cinematography, score, and performances, particularly to Farrant and O'Connor.

Premise
London teenager Alex Rider is recruited by the Department of Special Operations, a subdivision of the Secret Intelligence Service (MI6), to infiltrate a controversial corrective academy for the wayward offspring of the ultra-rich.

Cast and characters

Main

 Otto Farrant as Alex Rider, a highly skilled teenager who is recruited by the Department of Special Operations.
 Stephen Dillane as Alan Blunt, the shrewd head of the Department of Special Operations.
 Vicky McClure as Mrs Jones, deputy head of the Department of Special Operations and Alex's handler.
 Andrew Buchan as Ian Rider (season 1), an agent of the Department of Special Operations and Alex's uncle.
 Brenock O'Connor as Tom Harris, Alex's best friend.
 Ronkẹ Adékoluẹjo as Jack Starbright, a UCL graduate from America, who is Alex's primary carer and later Legal Guardian
 Liam Garrigan as Martin Wilby (season 1), an agent of the Department of Special Operations and a colleague of Ian.
 Ace Bhatti as John Crawley, chief of staff of the Department of Special Operations.
 Thomas Levin as Yassen Gregorovitch, a mysterious assassin.
 Haluk Bilginer as Dr Hugo Grief (season 1), director of Point Blanc, a mysterious academy.
 Howard Charles as Wolf (season 1), the leader of a Special Air Service (SAS) squad.
 Nyasha Hatendi as Smithers, the quartermaster of the Department of Special Operations.
 Ana Ularu as Eva Stellenbosch (season 1), Dean of Students at Point Blanc.
 Marli Siu as Kyra Vashenko-Chao, a hacker from Singapore and a student at Point Blanc who keeps to herself. Her character is original to the series.
 Toby Stephens as Damian Cray (season 2), an energetic tech billionaire who is poised to launch a new version of his best-selling computer game, Feathered Serpent.
 Rakie Ayola as Jo Bryne (season 2), a tough new Deputy Director of the CIA.
 Charithra Chandran as Sabina Pleasance (season 2), a smart and confident teen whose journalist father is writing a book on Damian Cray.
 Gwyneth Keyworth as Evelyn (season 2), Damian Cray's chief programmer.
 Sofia Helin as Julia Rothman (season 3), an enigmatic, wealthy widow who is secretly a high ranking agent of the crime syndicate Scorpia.
 Kevin McNally as Max Grendel (season 3), an antagonist and a senior member of Scorpia.
 Jason Wong as Nile (season 3), an assassin working for Scorpia.

Recurring

 George Sear as Parker Roscoe, an American graduate of Point Blanc and the heir to a media empire.
 Andrew Buzzeo as Mr Boswell, Alex and Tom's English teacher.
 Macy Nyman as Steph, a student at Alex's school who is attracted to Tom.
 Shalisha James-Davis as Ayisha, a popular student at Alex's school who has a mutual attraction with him.
 Ky Discala as Eagle, the sniper in Wolf's squad.
 Rebecca Scroggs as Snake, a member of Wolf's squad.
 Ben Peel as Fox, a member of Wolf's squad.
 Talitha Wing as Sasha, a model student at Point Blanc who is attracted to Alex.
 Nathan Clarke as Arrash, a model student at Point Blanc.
 Katrin Vankova as Laura, a student at Point Blanc who befriends Alex.
 Earl Cave as James, the Australian heir to an arms industry corporation and a student at Point Blanc who befriends Alex.

Guest

 Steven Brand as Michael Roscoe, the CEO of Roscorp Media and Parker's father.
 Llewella Gideon as Miss Baker, a teacher at Alex's school.
 Simon Shepherd as Sir David Friend, the owner of the Friend Foundation, a multi-billion pound food production and distribution empire.
 Josh Herdman as Stan, a barber.
 Lucy Akhurst as Lady Caroline Friend, Sir David's wife.
 Alana Boden as Fiona Friend, Sir David and Lady Caroline's spoilt daughter.
 Ralph Prosser as Rafe, a friend of Fiona.
 Simon Paisley Day as Dr Baxter, the physician and physical education teacher at Point Blanc.
 James Gracie as Langham, Parker's personal assistant.
 Ali Hadji-Heshmati as Javid, a friend of Tom and Alex.

Episodes

Season 1 (2020)

Season 2 (2021)

Production

Development
In May 2017, Variety reported that Eleventh Hour Films had optioned the film rights for Horowitz's Alex Rider series and would produce the series for ITV. Guy Burt was attached as showrunner. The series is directed by Andreas Prochaska and Christopher Smith.

In July 2018, Variety reported that Eleventh Hour Films would be teaming up with Sony Pictures Television to produce an eight episode adaptation of Point Blanc, the second book in the Alex Rider series. Horowitz served as an executive producer on the series. Sony Pictures Television's international and worldwide distribution divisions under Wayne Garvie and Keith Le Goy were attached to the series. Sony was responsible for funding and looking for broadcasting or platform distributors.

On 10 November 2020, the series was officially renewed for a second season and will adapt the Alex Rider book Eagle Strike. As of 12 May 2021, a third season was in development. In August 2022, the series was renewed for its third season, with production reportedly scheduled to begin in October 2022.

Casting
It was announced on 23 April 2019 that Otto Farrant would star as the titular character. More cast members were announced the following day, including Brenock O'Connor, Stephen Dillane, Vicky McClure, Jon Brackenridge, Andrew Buchan, Ronkẹ Adékoluẹjo, Ace Bhatti and Nyasha Hatendi.

Toby Stephens, Rakie Ayola, and Charithra Chandran joined the cast for season 2.

Kevin McNally joined the cast for season 3 in a villainous role.

Filming
The first season was produced over six months, beginning in March 2019. Filming locations included London and, for the French Alps scenes, around Sinaia in Prahova County, Romania.

As it was meant to be renewed earlier, principal photography for the second season was initially set to take place in late 2020 before being pushed to 2021 due to the COVID-19 pandemic. The series began production in February 2021 in Bristol, England, at the old buildings near Cumberland Basin, The Watershed & Queen Square (with Canary Wharf graphically imposed behind). In February the crew were spotted filming scenes at Goldney Hall. Filming moved to Cornwall in March 2021 and at Widemouth Bay where Otto Farrant was spotted on set. Production also took place in Cardiff in March where the city was reportedly doubling for London in some shots. In April 2021, it was reported that Alex Rider was filming at Cotswold Airport during the night. Filming was done mostly on an ex British Airways Boeing 747-400 aircraft, the aircraft in question was G-CIVB and was used to shoot the final 2 episodes. In June 2021, author Anthony Horowitz tweeted that filming for Season 2 had concluded.

Filming of the third season began in Bristol during October 2022, with production expected to take place over six months in the United Kingdom and Croatia. In November 2022, production reportedly took place at Cardiff Bay Barrage. Filming was also conducted in Gloucester in December 2022, with production reportedly due to finish in March 2023. Location filming also took place in Malta.

Release

Marketing
While promoting the series, lead star Otto Farrant praised the show for addressing societal shifts which allowed men to talk about their feelings, sensitivities, and vulnerabilities. He also stated that the series would appeal to a new teenage audience that was discovering the Alex Rider novel series for the first time by avoiding darker themes.

In early December 2021, Alex Rider creator and executive producer Anthony Horowitz confirmed that the second season would explore the protagonist's struggle with post traumatic stress disorder following the events of the first season and that the second season would adapt the events of the fourth novel Eagle Strike. Toby Stephens, who played the antagonistic Damian Cray, described his character as less flamboyant than the book version and drew inspiration from "Big Tech" entrepreneurs Jeff Bezos and Elon Musk for his character. Returning cast member Ronke Adékoluęjo confirmed that the second season would explore her continuing her role as Alex's guardian while pursuing her dream of becoming a lawyer.

Distribution
The eight-episode first season was released on Amazon Prime Video in the United Kingdom and Ireland on 4 June 2020, and was released on Amazon Prime Video in Australia, Germany, and Austria later in mid-2020. In New Zealand, the television series is distributed by TVNZ On Demand.  The show premiered on Prime in Canada, Italy, and Latin America and on Amazon's IMDb TV in the United States.
In December 2021, season 1 of Alex Rider was aired on E4 in the United Kingdom and became available on its streaming platform All 4.

The second season was released by IMDb TV in the United Kingdom and the United States on 3 December 2021, and on Amazon Prime Video in Australia, Canada, Italy, Germany, Latin America, and New Zealand.

Both the first and second season is available in the Sony LIV streaming platform

Reception
For the first season, the review aggregator website Rotten Tomatoes reported an 86% approval rating, with an average rating of 6.4/10 based on 27 reviews. The website's consensus reads, "Alex Riders first season takes a minute to find it's footing, but once it does it proves a solid entry into the espionage game that the whole family can enjoy." Metacritic, which uses a weighted average, assigned a score of 67 out of 100 based on 8 critics, indicating "generally favorable reviews".

Reviewing for The Guardian, Lucy Mangan gave the series three out of five stars, describing it as an "improbable, action-packed romp for all your escapism needs." She described Alex Rider as a teenage James Bond, praising the lead star Otto Farrant for bringing more to the role than was written into what she described as a "serviceable script." She described the series as a blend of Jason Bourne and Spooks. NME Will Richards gave the series three out of five stars, describing it as a second-chance for the Alex Rider series following the failure of the 2006 Stormbreaker movie adaptation. Richards observed that the series avoided the clichéd James Bond gadgets for the first two episodes. Richards praised Farrant's performance as Alex Rider but opined that the series needed tinkering to identify its target audience. Richards also described co-star Brenock O'Connor's performance as Alex's best friend Tom Harris as charismatic. While praising Marli Siu's character Kyra as a worthy addition to the male-centric world of the series, he expressed disappointment that Vicky McClure and Stephen Dillane's characters were under-utilised.

Ed Cumming of The Independent awarded the series three out of five stars, describing it as "stylish but not sanitised, catching more of the books' momentum and bringing them up to speed with the 21st century." He regarded Alex Rider as more faithful to the series than the 2006 Stormbreaker film. He also praised Farrant's version of Alex Rider as more plausible than Alex Pettyfer's version of the character, describing the former as "a teenage schoolboy with a footballer haircut but less of a male-model energy." Cumming also praised the series for aiming at both young adults and adults, inclusion of modern communications technologies like smartphones and social media, and more diverse cast. The Spinoff reviewer Sam Brooks praised the TV series for capturing the spirit of the original novel series and appealing to both teenagers and adult fans who had grown up reading the novel series. Brooks also praised Farrant's performance as Alex Rider, opining that he nailed the soul of the teenage protagonist by capturing his strengths, moods, and fears.

The Telegraph Anita Singh gave the series four out of five stars, describing it as "slick and stylish, bringing the stories up-to-date with smartphones and cybertechnology while sticking to the spirit of Boy's Own adventures". She regarded it as far superior to the 2006 film and praised the series for its unique cinematography of London. Singh also positively compared it to the Bourne franchise and praised the series for being able to entertain adults and teenagers alike. Emmy Griffiths of Hello! magazine compared the television series favourably to the 2006 film, praising the show's pacing, worldbuilding, and family-oriented audience. She described the series as both a "coming-of-age tale" for Alex Rider with a police-procedural subplot focusing on MI6's efforts to track down Alex's uncle Ian's killer. Griffiths also praised Farrant, McClure, and O'Connor's performances.

References

External links
 
 

2020 British television series debuts
2020s British drama television series
Alex Rider
Amazon Prime Video original programming
Boarding school fiction
British high school television series
British thriller television series
English-language television shows
Espionage television series
Secret Intelligence Service in fiction
Television shows based on British novels
Television series about cloning
Television series about orphans
Television series about teenagers
Television series by Sony Pictures Television
Television productions postponed due to the COVID-19 pandemic
Television shows filmed in the United Kingdom
Television shows filmed in Romania
Television shows set in France
Television shows set in London
Television shows set in New York City